The European route E95 is a road in Europe and a part of the United Nations International E-road network. Between its northern terminus in Russia and its southern end, it passes in addition through Belarus and Ukraine.

In Ukraine, the E95 designation is not signed as Ukraine does not number its routes at all except in internal circumstances.

Route 

: St. Petersburg - Pushkin - Gatchina - Luga - Pskov - Ostrov - Opochka - Pustoshka - Nevel

: Haradok - Vitebsk - Orsha - Mogilev - Gomel

: Chernihiv - Brovary - Kyiv
: Kyiv - Vasylkiv - Bila Tserkva
: Bila Tserkva
: Zhashkiv - Uman - Blahovishchenske - Liubashivka - Petrovirivka - Znamianka - Odesa

  Odesa –  Samsun

There currently is no ferry from Odesa to Samsun.

: Samsun
: Samsun - Kavak - Havza - Kayadüzü (Start of Concurrency with )
: Kayadüzü - Merzifon (End of Concurrency with

Trivia 
Russian hard rock band Alisa has a song called "Trassa E-95"  dedicated to the road between Moscow and Saint Petersburg (previously part of E95, now part of E105).

References

External links 
 UN Economic Commission for Europe: Overall Map of E-road Network (2007)

 
E095
E095
European routes in Ukraine
E95